Hindi-language horror films have been a subgenre of the Hindi film industry in India since the birth of Hindi films. These films tend to mimic the same characteristics and themes as horror films around the world. The themes explored within these films consist of haunted houses, evil spirits and demonic forces. Even though these films are considered to be violent, the public still enjoys them.

This is a list of notable Indian horror films in Hindi language.

See also 
 List of Hindi horror shows
 List of Bollywood thriller films
 List of Bollywood comedy films
 List of Indian horror films
 Bollywood content lists

References

Horror films
Indian horror films